Kibrom Solomon (born 10 September 2000) is an Eritrean footballer who plays for Eritrean Premier League club Denden FC and the Eritrea national team.

International career
Solomon made his senior international debut on 4 September 2019 in a 2022 FIFA World Cup qualification match against Namibia. Later that year he represented Eritrea in the 2019 CECAFA Cup as the team went on to be the surprise runners-up after losing to Uganda in the final. He was then named the nation's starting goalkeeper in the 2021 CECAFA U-23 Challenge Cup.

Career statistics

References

External links
 
 

2000 births
Eritrean footballers
Eritrea international footballers
Living people
Association football goalkeepers